Butte Falls is a city in Jackson County, Oregon, United States. The population was 423 at the 2010 census. As of July 1, 2018, the city's population was estimated to be 450.

History 
Butte Falls was incorporated as a city in 1911.

Geography

Climate
This region experiences warm (but not hot) and dry summers, with no average monthly temperatures above .  According to the Köppen Climate Classification system, Butte Falls has a warm-summer Mediterranean climate, abbreviated "Csb" on climate maps.

Demographics

2010 census
As of the census of 2010, there were 423 people, 166 households, and 112 families living in the town. The racial makeup of the town was 95.7% White, 0.7% Native American, 0.5% Asian, 0.2% Pacific Islander, and 2.8% from two or more races. Hispanic or Latino of any race were 2.4% of the population.

There were 166 households, of which 32.5% had children under the age of 18 living with them, 45.8% were married couples living together, 9.6% had a female householder with no husband present, 12.0% had a male householder with no wife present, and 32.5% were non-families. 25.9% of all households were made up of individuals, and 7.8% had someone living alone who was 65 years of age or older. The average household size was 2.55 and the average family size was 2.92.

The median age in the town was 43.1 years. 22.7% of residents were under the age of 18; 11.1% were between the ages of 18 and 24; 19.1% were from 25 to 44; 33.6% were from 45 to 64; and 13.5% were 65 years of age or older. The gender makeup of the town was 52.5% male and 47.5% female.

2000 census
As of the US Federal census of 2000, there were 439 people, 160 households, and 112 families living in the city. The population density was 1,100.2 people per square mile (423.7/km). There were 170 housing units at an average density of 426.0 per square mile (164.1/km). The racial makeup of the city was 93.85% White, 2.73% Native American, 0.23% Asian, 0.91% from other races, and 2.28% from two or more races. Hispanic or Latino of any race were 2.51% of the population. There were 160 households, out of which 41.3% had children under the age of 18 living with them, 50.6% were married couples living together, 11.3% had a female householder with no husband present, and 29.4% were non-families. 23.1% of all households were made up of individuals, and 10.0% had someone living alone who was 65 years of age or older. The average household size was 2.74 and the average family size was 3.20.

In the city, the population was 31.9% under the age of 18, 6.8% from 18 to 24, 28.5% from 25 to 44, 21.0% from 45 to 64, and 11.8% who were 65 years of age or older. The median age was 33 years. For every 100 females, there were 104.2 males. For every 100 females age 18 and over, there were 99.3 males. The median income for a household in the city was $23,750, and the median income for a family was $30,132. Males had a median income of $27,188 versus $14,875 for females. The per capita income for the city was $11,511. About 15.1% of families and 22.1% of the population were below the poverty line, including 25.2% of those under age 18 and 28.6% of those age 65 or over.

See also 
 Big Butte Creek Falls

References

External links
 Entry for Butte Falls in the Oregon Blue Book

 
Cities in Oregon
Cities in Jackson County, Oregon
1911 establishments in Oregon
Populated places established in 1911